Engine House No. 28 is a historic fire station building located at Buffalo in Erie County, New York. It is a Queen Anne style structure built in 1897.

It was listed on the National Register of Historic Places in 2001.

References

External links
Engine House No. 28 - Buffalo, NY - U.S. National Register of Historic Places on Waymarking.com

Buildings and structures in Buffalo, New York
Fire stations on the National Register of Historic Places in New York (state)
Queen Anne architecture in New York (state)
Fire stations completed in 1897
Government buildings completed in 1897
National Register of Historic Places in Buffalo, New York
Buffalo Fire Department